Xenopus boumbaensis, the Mawa clawed frog, is a species of frog in the family Pipidae. It is known from a few localities in central and south-eastern Cameroon, and from north-western Republic of Congo and extreme south-western Central African Republic; it probably occurs more widely in the central African forest belt, but identification is difficult: it is one of the cryptic species that resemble Xenopus fraseri, from which it can be distinguished by chromosome number (2n=72) and a male advertisement call of a single note.

Etymology
The specific name boumbaensis refers to the type locality (Mawa) that is within the Boumba River drainage.

Description
All Xenopus are characterized by a streamlined and flattened body, a vocal organ specialized for underwater sound production, lateral-line organs, claws on the innermost three toes, and fully webbed toes. The coloration is green with numerous spots posteriorly and on the hind limbs. The venter can be immaculate white but is often heavily spotted.

Xenopus boumbaensis is an octoploid species (2n=72).

Habitat and conservation
It is typically found in forested habitats in slow-flowing forest streams and springs, but may also be found in swamps. Reproduction presumably involves free-living larvae. It is threatened by deforestation and habitat degradation as well as water pollution. It is known from a number of protected areas: Boumba Bek, Nki, and Lobeke National Parks in Cameroon, Dzanga-Sangha Special Reserve in the Central African Republic, and the Odzala-Kokoua National Park in the Republic of Congo.

References

boumbaensis
Frogs of Africa
Amphibians of Cameroon
Amphibians of the Central African Republic
Amphibians of the Republic of the Congo
Amphibians described in 1983
Taxonomy articles created by Polbot